Alireza Zakani (born 3 March 1966 in Shahr-e Rey) is an Iranian conservative politician and current mayor of Tehran. He was a member of the Parliament of Iran from 2004 to 2016 and also from 2020 to 2021. He owns Jahan News website and Panjereh Weekly.

He announced ran for presidency in 2013 and 2017 but was disqualified by Guardian Council both times. He was a candidate for the 2021 presidential election, but withdrew in favour of Ebrahim Raisi.

Life 
Alireza Zakani was born in 1965 in the Khorasan Square neighborhood of Tehran and spent his childhood and adolescence in the same area. Zakani's grandfather (on his mother's side) is a resident of Tabriz, East Azerbaijan Province. His maternal grandfather was from Kashan and his paternal ancestors also lived in the northern villages of Tehran. His father was Hossein Zakani, one of the heroes of Tehran and the Shahr-e Rey region, who was responsible for holding Gholamreza Takhti's anniversary for 28 years.

Islamic Consultative Assembly 
Zakani has been elected as the representative of the people of Qom city in the eleventh period of the Islamic Consultative Assembly (Parliament) since 2020, and he has the record as the head of the special committee in order to investigate the Joint Comprehensive Plan of Action.

Margins 
Exactly three days after Zakani was appointed mayor of Tehran, Mohammad Saleh Meftah by creating a campaign under the title "Request for annulment of the decree of the mayor of Tehran" sued him and asked the interior minister to overturn the this illegal ruling.

References

External links 
 

1965 births
Living people
Deputies of Tehran, Rey, Shemiranat and Eslamshahr
Society of Pathseekers of the Islamic Revolution politicians
People from Tehran
Members of the 7th Islamic Consultative Assembly
Members of the 8th Islamic Consultative Assembly
Members of the 9th Islamic Consultative Assembly
Alliance of Builders of Islamic Iran politicians
Iranian news website owners (people)
Popular Front of Islamic Revolution Forces politicians
Secretaries-General of political parties in Iran
Volunteer Basij personnel of the Iran–Iraq War
Iranian campaign managers